The Lingga Isaq Game Reserve is found in Indonesia. It was established in 1978. This site is 800 km2. It is located in Central Aceh, average 50 km from Takengon City.

A socio-economic study showed that 52.57% of the local community's income comes from coffee plantations planted in the reserve area.

References

Protected areas of Indonesia
Protected areas established in 1978
Wildlife sanctuaries of Indonesia